Rafael "Ka Paeng" Vitriolo Mariano (born October 24, 1956) is a Filipino politician. He was a member of the House of Representatives for Anakpawis serving from 2004 to 2013. He is also the chairman of the farmers militant group Kilusang Magbubukid ng Pilipinas (KMP).

Mariano served as Secretary of the Department of Agrarian Reform under the administration of President Rodrigo Duterte, who appointed him, after being nominated by the National Democratic Front. His appointment as Secretary of Agrarian Reform was rejected by the Commission on Appointments (CA) on September 6, 2017, making him the 4th member of the Duterte Cabinet to be rejected by the CA.

Early life  
Mariano was born on October 24, 1956, to a poor family in the municipality of Quezon, Nueva Ecija. He was a farmer who took up agriculture and agri-cooperatives at the Wesleyan University and Christian College of the Philippines (formerly Liwag Colleges) in Cabanatuan. He failed to graduate from both institutions due to financial difficulties and his father's illness.

Political career 

Mariano joined the Bisig ng Kabataan (Youth Arm), a local youth activist organization, when he was 20 years old. He was elected as councilor of Quezon, Nueva Ecija five years later in 1981. He became the regional vice chairman of the Alyansa ng Magbubukid sa Gitnang Luzon (Central Luzon Farmers' Alliance) in 1984 and as secretary-general of the Kilusang Magbubukid ng Pilipinas (Farmers' Movement of the Philippines) in 1985. He later served as the movement's national vice chairman and national chairman. He was among the survivors of the 1987 Mendiola massacre.

In 1998, he assumed the chairmanship of the Bagong Alyansang Makabayan. He was nominated to the Anakpawis party-list in the 2004 general elections and served as the party's representative in the Philippine House of Representatives until 2013. During his term, he pressed for the passage of the Genuine Agrarian Reform Bill which aimed to distribute land to farmers for free. He was one of five progressive legislators who were detained for 2 months in 2006 in the Batasang Pambansa Complex on charges of plotting to overthrow the government of then President Gloria Arroyo.

References

External links
 Rafael Mariano at the House of Representatives
 Anakpawis

1956 births
Filipino socialists
Filipino farmers
Living people
Secretaries of Agrarian Reform of the Philippines
Members of the House of Representatives of the Philippines for Anakpawis
Duterte administration cabinet members
People from Nueva Ecija